"We Never Touch at All" is a song recorded by American country music artist Merle Haggard backed by The Strangers.  It was released in July 1988 as the third single from the album Chill Factor.  The song reached  number 22 on the Billboard Hot Country Singles & Tracks chart.  The song was written by Hank Cochran.

Chart performance

References

1988 singles
1988 songs
Merle Haggard songs
Songs written by Hank Cochran
Epic Records singles